Alexander Lynggaard (born 27 March 1990) is a Danish handball player. He plays for Bjerringbro-Silkeborg Håndbold and the Danish national team.

He competed at the 2016 European Men's Handball Championship.

References

External links

1990 births
Living people
People from Køge Municipality
Danish male handball players
Expatriate handball players
Danish expatriate sportspeople in France
Sportspeople from Region Zealand